Òscar Cadiach i Puig (born 1952 in Barcelona) is a Spanish mountain climber. He has climbed all the 14 eight-thousanders.

Life 
Cadiach grew up in Tarragona. At age 14 he became interested in mountain climbing and with 22 he was working as an instructor at the Escola Catalana d’Alta Muntanya (‚Catalan high mountains school‘).

In the 1980s he started to climb the eight-thousanders with the Nanga Parbat being the first summit to be reached in 1984. In 1985 he climbed the Mount Everest, where Cadiach managed to climb the technically difficult Second Step unaided for the first time. In 2013 he climbed his 13th eight-thousander, the Gasherbrum I.

Besides he also traveled to America and Africa. He also worked as a photographer and took part in several documentary productions. In the documentary Al Filo de lo Imposible he took the role of George Mallory. For the Catalan TV program El Cim at TV3 he led six rather inexperienced young mountain climbers to the summit of Aconcagua in 2003.

Climbing of eight-thousanders 
Cadiach has climbed the eight-thousanders in the following order:

 Nanga Parbat (8126 m) on 07.08.1984
 Mount Everest (8848 m) on 28.08.1985, second climb on 17.05.1993
 Shishapangma (8027 m) on 04.10.1993
 Cho Oyu (8201 m) on 29.09.1996, second climb on 04.05.1997
 Makalu (8462 m) on 19.05.1998
 Gasherbrum II (8035 m) on 07.07.1999
 Lhotse (8516 m) on 23.05.2001
 Manaslu (8163 m) on 04.10.2011
 Annapurna (8091 m) on 06.05.2012
 Dhaulagiri (8167 m) on 25.05.2012
 K2 (8611 m) on 31.07.2012
 Kangchenjunga (8586 m) on 20.05.2013
 Gasherbrum I (8068 m) on 29.07.2013
 Broad Peak (8047 m) on 27.07.2017

See also
List of 20th-century summiters of Mount Everest
List of Mount Everest summiters by number of times to the summit

References

Further reading 
 Eduard Sallent: El camí dels estels: una novel·la basada en Òscar Cadiach. Desnivel, 2012, .

External links 
 Official website oscarcadiach.com
 Oscar Cadiach's Blog 

1952 births
Living people
Spanish mountain climbers
Sportspeople from Barcelona
Spanish summiters of Mount Everest
Summiters of all 14 eight-thousanders